Nageshwar Dwivedi (16 October 1916 – 1 January 2010) was an Indian politician.  He was elected to the Lok Sabha, the lower house of the Parliament of India from the Machhlishahr, Uttar Pradesh  as a member of the Indian National Congress.

References

External links
Official biographical sketch in Parliament of India website
Mention of Nageshwar Dwivedi's death 

Indian National Congress politicians
1916 births
2010 deaths
Indian National Congress politicians from Uttar Pradesh